Sir Henry Tate, 1st Baronet (11 March 18195 December 1899), was an English sugar merchant and philanthropist, noted for establishing the Tate Gallery in London.

Life and career
Born in White Coppice, a hamlet near Chorley, Lancashire, Tate was the son of a Unitarian clergyman, the Reverend William Tate, and his wife Agnes  Booth. When he was 13, he became a grocer's apprentice in Liverpool. After a seven-year apprenticeship, he was able to set up his own shop. His business was successful, and grew to a chain of six stores by the time he was 35. In 1859 Tate became a partner in John Wright & Co. sugar refinery, selling his grocery business in 1861. By 1869, he had gained complete control of the company, and renamed it as Henry Tate & Sons. In 1872, he purchased the patent from German Eugen Langen for making sugar cubes, and in the same year built a new refinery in Liverpool. In 1877 he opened a refinery at Silvertown, London, which remains in production. At the time, much of Silvertown was still marshland. Tate was a modest, rather retiring man, well known for his concern with workers’ conditions. He built the Tate Institute opposite his Thames Refinery, with a bar and dance hall for the workers' recreation.

Tate became wealthy and donated generously to charity. In 1889 he donated his collection of 65 contemporary paintings to the government, on the condition that they be displayed in a suitable gallery, toward the construction of which he also donated £80,000. The National Gallery of British Art, nowadays known as Tate Britain, was opened on 21 July 1897, on the site of the old Millbank Prison.

Tate made many donations, often anonymously and always discreetly. He supported "alternative" and non-establishment causes. For example, he donated £10,000 for the library of Manchester College, founded in Manchester in 1786 as a dissenting academy to provide religious nonconformists with higher education. He also gave the college (which had retained its name during moves to York, London and finally Oxford), £5,000 to promote the ‘theory and art of preaching’. In addition he gave £20,000 to the (homoeopathic) Hahnemann Hospital in Liverpool in 1885. He particularly supported health and education with his money, giving £42,500 for Liverpool University, £3,500 for Bedford College for Women, and £5,000 for building a free library in Streatham. Additional provisions were made for libraries in Balham, South Lambeth, and Brixton. He also gave £8,000 to the Liverpool Royal Infirmary, and £5,000 to the Queen Victoria Jubilee Institute, which became the Queen's Institute for District Nurses.

Tate was made a baronet on 27 June 1898. He had refused this title more than once until – after he had spent £150,000 to build the Millbank Gallery, endowed it with his personal collection, and presented it to the nation – he was told the Royal Family would be offended if he refused again.

In 1921, after Tate's death, Henry Tate & Sons merged with Abram Lyle & Sons to form Tate & Lyle.

In 2001, a blue plaque commemorating Sir Henry was unveiled on the site of his first shop at 42 Hamilton Street, Birkenhead.  In 2006 a Wetherspoons pub in his home town of Chorley was named after the sugar magnate.

Personal life
Tate married Jane Wignall on 1 March 1841 in Liverpool. They had three sons. Tate lived at Park Hill by Streatham Common, South London, and is buried in nearby West Norwood Cemetery, the gates of which are opposite a public library that he endowed. Park Hill became a nunnery after his death until refurbishment as housing around 2004.

Gallery

Notes and references

External links

Tate Gallery
Tate & Lyle
Sir Henry Tate
The Sugar Girls blog: 'Happy Birthday, Henry Tate!'
 http://www.thepeerage.com/p59124.htm#i591238

1819 births
1899 deaths
Businesspeople from Wirral
English philanthropists
Baronets in the Baronetage of the United Kingdom
People from Chorley
History of the London Borough of Lambeth
Burials at West Norwood Cemetery
Museum founders
People associated with the Tate galleries
Tate & Lyle people
19th-century British philanthropists
Businesspeople in the sugar industry
19th-century English businesspeople